Lorent Tolaj (born 23 October 2001) is a Swiss professional footballer who plays as a forward for Scottish Championship club Dundee, on loan from Brighton & Hove Albion of the Premier League.

Club career

Brighton & Hove Albion
Born in Aigle, Tolaj joined Brighton & Hove Albion's academy in 2018 after playing youth football for Swiss side FC Sion. He would score two goals for the Seagulls' under-23 side in their 4–2 win over Worthing in the 2022 Sussex Senior Challenge Cup final.

Cambridge United, Salford City, and Dundee loans
On 31 January 2022, he joined EFL League One club Cambridge United on loan until the end of the season. A day later, he made his debut for the U's as a substitute in the 2–0 away defeat at Bolton Wanderers. On 18 April, it was confirmed that Tolaj had returned to his parent club Brighton after struggling for game time at Cambridge only making five appearances in all competitions.

On 23 August, Tolaj signed for League Two side Salford City on loan for the 2022–23 season. However, on 31 January 2023, Tolaj left Salford and joined Scottish Championship club Dundee on loan until the end of the season. He made his debut for the Dark Blues as a substitute in a league game away to Hamilton Academical.

International career
Born in Switzerland, Tolaj is of Kosovan descent. He has represented Switzerland internationally at under-17, under-18 and under-19 levels. On 19 November 2019, Tolaj scored eight goals in Switzerland U19's 16–1 win over Gibraltar U19, setting the record for the most goals scored in a under-19 Euro qualifier.

Career statistics

Honours 
Brighton & Hove Albion

 Sussex Senior Challenge Cup: 2022

References

2001 births
Living people
Swiss people of Kosovan descent
People from Aigle
Swiss men's footballers
Sportspeople from the canton of Vaud
Association football forwards
FC Sion players
Brighton & Hove Albion F.C. players
Cambridge United F.C. players
Salford City F.C. players
Dundee F.C. players
English Football League players
Scottish Professional Football League players
Switzerland youth international footballers
Swiss expatriate footballers
Swiss expatriate sportspeople in Scotland
Swiss expatriate sportspeople in England
Expatriate footballers in Scotland
Expatriate footballers in England